Cumberland County may refer to:

Australia 
 Cumberland County, New South Wales
 the former name of Cumberland Land District, Tasmania, Australia

Canada 
Cumberland County, Nova Scotia

United Kingdom 
Cumberland, historic county
Cumberland (unitary authority), proposed non-metropolitan county and district

United States 
 Cumberland County, Illinois 
 Cumberland County, Kentucky 
 Cumberland County, Maine 
 Cumberland County, New Jersey 
 Cumberland County, New York
 Cumberland County, North Carolina 
 Cumberland County, Pennsylvania 
 Cumberland County, Tennessee
 Cumberland County, Republic of Vermont 
 Cumberland County, Virginia

Fictional places 
 Cumberland County, Wyoming, next door county to the setting of the Longmire television series and novels by author Craig Johnson

See also 
 Cumberland (disambiguation)
 Cumberland County College